Carihi Secondary is a public high school in Campbell River, British Columbia part of School District 72 and School District 93 Conseil scolaire francophone.

Carihi School opened in 1965 to accommodate the overpopulated Campbell River Middle/High School (now known as Ecole Phoenix Middle School). In the 1980s, the school was called "Campbell River High". The students began calling it Carihi and eventually the name was changed.

References

Campbell River, British Columbia
High schools in British Columbia
Educational institutions established in 1965
1965 establishments in British Columbia